Shaqiq al-Balkhi (d. 810 / AH 194) was an early Sufi saint of the Khorasan school.
Tradition makes him the disciple of Ibrahim ibn Adham.
He emphasized the importance of tawakkul or reliance upon God.

References

810 deaths
Sufi saints